Matrix is a jazz fusion group from Appleton, Wisconsin, that started in 1974, noted for tight brass ensemble lines and complex musical themes inspired by literary works, the American Indian, and other significant programmatic themes.  Matrix made its biggest impact on the music scene in the 1970s, including appearances at the Monterey Jazz Festival in 1976 and 1977 and the Newport Jazz Festival in 1977.

The group re-formed in 1992, 2000, 2002, and 2009.

Album titles include Matrix IX (also the original name of the band), Wizard, Tale of the Whale, Harvest and Proud Flesh.

Original members 
 Michael Bard - saxophones
 Larry Darling - trumpet, flugelhorn, synthesizer, vocals
 Kurt Dietrich - trombone, synthesizer, vocals
 Randall Fird - bass, vocals
 Mike Hale - trumpet, flugelhorn, percussion, vocals
 John Harmon - keyboard
 Jeff Pietrangelo - trumpet, flugelhorn, percussion
 Fred Sturm - trombone, vocals
 Tony Wagner - drums

Latest members (Warner Bros., Pablo touring era, circa 1977 - 1980) 
 Larry Darling (Zap) - trumpet, flugelhorn, synthesizer, vocals
 Mike Hale (Tex) - trumpet, flugelhorn, percussion, vocals
 Jeff Pietrangelo (Chimp) - trumpet, flugelhorn, percussion
 Kurt Dietrich (Dietch) - trombone, synthesizer, vocals
 Brad McDougall (Barry) - bass Trombone, euphonium, vocals
 John Kirchberger (Kirch) - tenor & soprano saxophones, flute, alto flute
 Randy Tico - bass
 John Harmon (Chief) - keyboard
 Michael Murphy (Murph) - Drums
 Peter Butler (Herb) - Senior Sound Engineer
 Doug Lautenschlager (Lauben) - Sound Engineer

Discography 
 Matrix IX (RCA - 1976)
 Wizard (Warner Bros. - 1978, Reissued on CD in 2009. Wounded Bird Records)
 Tale of the Whale – Recorded in April 1979. Released 1979. Warner Brothers #BSK 3360. Spent 9 weeks on Billboard's Jazz LP chart in late 1979, peaking at #28 on 15 Sept.  Reissued on CD July 2009. Wounded Bird Records #WOU 3360. Tracks include: 1) The Fly, 2) Tale Of The Whale, 3) Homage, 4) Galadriel, 5) Nessim, and 6) Narouz.
 Harvest - (Pablo - 1979)
 Proud Flesh (Summit - 2002)

References

External links

Jazz fusion ensembles
Musical groups established in 1974
Musical groups from Wisconsin
Summit Records artists
American jazz ensembles